Taphrina tosquinetii is a fungal plant pathogen that causes large blisters on both surfaces of the leaves of alder.

Description of the gall
The ascomycete induces a gall that distorts the leaves of alder. The leaves are slightly thickened, brittle and incurved with blister-like growth on both sides, which can increase the size of an infected leaf to twice the normal size. Later the leaf tissue becomes pale and thin with a whitish bloom when the asci develop. Species infected include common alder (Alnus glutinosa), grey alder (Alnus incana) and Alnus x pubescens.

References

Taphrinomycetes
Fungi described in 1866
Fungi of Europe
Galls
Taxa named by Edmond Tulasne